The 2011–12 Sacramento Kings season was the 67th season of the franchise, its 63rd season in the National Basketball Association (NBA), and its 27th in Sacramento.

Key dates
 June 23: The 2011 NBA draft took place at Prudential Center in Newark, New Jersey.

Possible relocation
Henry Samueli, the owner of the Anaheim Ducks and Anaheim Arena Management, has hoped to bring an NBA franchise to Honda Center in Anaheim since he took control of the arena in the early 2000s. The Sacramento Kings had expressed an interest in relocating to Anaheim from their current stadium, Power Balance Pavilion (formerly ARCO Arena).
On March 3, 2011, a lawyer representing the Maloof brothers (owners of the Kings) filed federal trademark applications for names for a new basketball team based in Anaheim. Those names included Anaheim Royals, Los Angeles Royals, Orange County Royals, and Anaheim Royals of Southern California. Of note, the city of Anaheim has mandated that any team playing at Honda Center must use "Anaheim" as its only geographic identifier. This requirement was made after the Los Angeles Angels of Anaheim added 'Los Angeles' to their official name. On May 2, 2011, the Maloofs announced they were staying in Sacramento for at least one more season, to try to make things work with a new Sports and Entertainment Complex in Sacramento.

Timeline of events
 July 1, 1997: Sacramento obtained a $70 million loan for the Kings.  A "Team Owner's Relocation Assurance Agreement" recites that Kings agree to stay in Sacramento for 30 years or until the loan is repaid.  But the contract includes a term prohibiting the City of Sacramento from preventing a relocation.
 November 8, 2003: As early as 2003, there had been speculation that the Kings may move to Anaheim. The Los Angeles Times reported that the Maloofs (then owners of the Kings) were interested in purchasing the then-Mighty Ducks of Anaheim who played (and still play) at the Arrowhead Pond/Honda Center. In that same article, Gavin Maloof was quoted as saying that "I think Anaheim would be a plus for the league. The arena is beautiful. The market is so rich. Three teams in that market, it could handle it." This, naturally, set off speculation that the Maloofs were considering a move to Orange County, however, a spokeswoman for the Maloofs quickly shot down the idea calling a possible Kings move to Anaheim "laughable."
 February 13, 2009: Speculation was renewed by the Orange County Register/Sacramento Bee that the Kings may be looking at Southern California as a possible new home.
 September 23, 2010: Anaheim Ducks and Anaheim Arena Management owner Henry Samueli renewed his interest in an NBA franchise relocating to Honda Center.
 December 6, 2010: ESPN, Sports Illustrated, and other news agencies were reporting that Anaheim is on the NBA's short list for a possible franchise relocation. At this time, however, speculation surrounded the New Orleans Hornets franchise and also the cities of Kansas City, Missouri; San Jose, California; Seattle, Washington; and Chicago, Illinois; along with Anaheim.
 January 9, 2011: Randy Youngman of the Orange County Register re-kindled the Kings to Anaheim speculation and the Register continued to publish Kings to Anaheim speculation for a week.
 February 10, 2011: The Sacramento city council unanimously voted to approve ICON and David Taylor to conduct a feasibility study for a new sports and entertainment center in the state capital. The Maloofs, at that time, reportedly agreed to hand over 11 years of financial/arena information documents to help in this study.
 February 19–22, 2011: NBA Commissioner David Stern acknowledged that there are ongoing talks between the Kings and Anaheim officials about a possible relocation during the All-Star festivities at Staples Center in Los Angeles.
 February 25, 2011: The Kings asked for an extension to the relocation filing deadline. The deadline is normally March 1.
 February 28, 2011: Kings fans organized to sell out then-ARCO Arena for a game against the Los Angeles Clippers in response to the relocation rumors.
 March 1, 2011: The NBA moved the relocation filing deadline back from March 1 to April 18 for the Kings.
 March 6, 2011: It was reported that the Taylor/ICON group would delay their report until they knew whether or not the Kings were staying in Sacramento.
 March 23–26, 2011: Jim Crandell reported that there is a possible "game changing" proposal that could keep the Kings in Sacramento. It was later reported, however, that the Maloofs had rejected this plan which calls for a renovation of Power Balance Pavilion.
 March 28, 2011: The Orange County Register reported that an official in the city of Sacramento had sent a letter to the city of Anaheim insisting that they cease negotiations with the Kings because of a $73,725,000 loan that is owed to the capital city by the Maloofs. Kings co-owner quickly shot back, saying that the letter was "below the belt" and that Sacramento should "not interfere with our business." The next day, the Los Angeles Times reported that California state senate president pro tempore Steinberg (D-Sacramento) is considering legislation that would prevent the Kings from moving until the debt is paid in full.
 March 29, 2011: The city of Anaheim unanimously approved a 75 million dollar bond to bring Honda Center up to modern NBA standards.
 April 14, 2011: The NBA Board of Governors met at the St. Regis Hotel in New York City where George Maloof, on behalf of the majority owners, made his case to the other owners that relocation was advisable. Anaheim Mayor Tom Tait, Anaheim City Manager Tom Wood, Anaheim Ducks owner Henry Samueli, and Anaheim Arena Management official Michael Schulman all attended the meetings to make the argument for relocation to their city. Sacramento mayor Kevin Johnson also attended the meetings and made the case why the Kings should remain in California's capital city or why Sacramento deserves a new team if the Kings leave. Johnson also announced during his presentation that Ron Burkle, a billionaire credited with helping keep the Pittsburgh Penguins in their home town, wanted to purchase the Kings franchise and keep them in Sacramento. Burkle's firm later sent out a press release confirming his interest in purchasing the Kings and keeping the NBA in Sacramento. The Orange County Register also reported that the fate of the Kings may be known by Friday, April 15.
 April 15, 2011: At an NBA Board of Governors meeting at the St. Regis Hotel in New York City, the NBA moved the relocation filing deadline for the Kings from March 18 to May 2.
 April 18, 2011: The Kings' second deadline to file for relocation. An extension to May 2 was granted on April 15.
 April 29, 2011: The Orange County Register reported that the relocation committee headed by Oklahoma City Thunder owner has suggested that the Kings remain in Sacramento. In response, Anaheim Ducks owner Henry Samueli upped his offer to the Maloofs, promising to pay for up to 70 million dollars in upgrades to Honda Center. He also reportedly secured 30 million dollars (to counter the 10 million that Sacramento mayor Kevin Johnson secured) in corporate funding and a six-year television deal that would pay out 24 million dollars annually. Samueli also upped his personal loan to the Maloofs to 75 million dollars and offered to buy a minority stake in the Kings. Following this report, the Maloofs have not filed for relocation and the relocation committee has not changed their reported suggestion.
 May 2, 2011:  George Maloof announces that the Kings will remain in Sacramento for at least one more season.

Cities considered future sites for the Kings 

The Kings not only looked at Anaheim in relocation plans, the team was offered deals in possible relocations to Kansas City, where the Kings once played until their move to Sacramento in 1985, Cincinnati, where the Kings used to be the Cincinnati Royals from 1957 to 1972, Pittsburgh due to a radio station report about the NHL's Pittsburgh Penguins may purchase the team, Las Vegas where the 2007 NBA All-Star Game, and Seattle the former home of the Oklahoma City Thunder (was the Seattle SuperSonics) when the team moved to Oklahoma in 2006. The Kings wanted to reuse the "Royals" namesake for Anaheim not to confuse with the NHL's Los Angeles Kings whose cross-region rival is the Anaheim Ducks, but if they move to Seattle, they will keep the "Kings" moniker and their closest opponent will be the Portland Trail Blazers in Oregon. ESPN's Basketball Editor in Chief recently told a Seattle Sports Station that Vancouver, British Columbia, Canada is the most "viable" option.

Draft picks

¤:Draft rights traded to Sacramento from the Milwaukee Bucks

Roster

Preseason
Due to the 2011 NBA lockout negotiations, the programmed preseason schedule, along with the first two weeks of the regular season, were scrapped, and a two-game preseason was set for each team once the lockout concluded.

|- bgcolor=
| 1
| December 17
| @ Golden State
| 
| Jimmer FredetteMarcus Thornton (21)
| J. J. Hickson (7)
| Tyreke Evans (7)
| Oracle Arena16,523
| 1–0
|- bgcolor=
| 2
| December 20
| Golden State
| 
| Marcus Thornton (21)
| DeMarcus Cousins (10)
| Tyreke Evans (7)
| Power Balance Pavilion12,425
| 1–1

Regular season

Standings

Record vs. opponents

Game log

|- bgcolor="#ccffcc"
| 1
| December 26
| L. A. Lakers
| 
| Marcus Thornton (27)
| DeMarcus Cousins (11)
| Three players (3)
| Power Balance Pavilion17,317
| 1–0
|- bgcolor="#ffcccc"
| 2
| December 27
| @ Portland
| 
| DeMarcus Cousins (16)
| DeMarcus CousinsChuck Hayes (11)
| Tyreke EvansMarcus Thornton (3)
| Rose Garden20,350
| 1–1
|- bgcolor="#ffcccc"
| 3
| December 29
| Chicago
| 
| Marcus Thornton (20)
| DeMarcus Cousins (12)
| Jimmer FredetteChuck Hayes (3)
| Power Balance Pavilion17,317
| 1–2
|- bgcolor=#fcc
| 4
| December 31
| New York
| 
| Marcus Thornton (14)
| Chuck Hayes (13)
| DeMarcus Cousins (4)
| Power Balance Pavilion16,175
| 1–3

|- bgcolor=#cfc
| 5
| January 1
| New Orleans
| 
| Tyreke Evans (27)
| Chuck Hayes (10)
| Jimmer Fredette (5)
| Power Balance Pavilion13,628
| 2–3
|- bgcolor=#fcc
| 6
| January 3
| @ Memphis
| 
| Jimmer Fredette (17)
| J.J. Hickson (10)
| Tyreke Evans (4)
| FedEx Forum12,391
| 2–4
|- bgcolor=#fcc
| 7
| January 4
| @ Denver
| 
| DeMarcus Cousins (26)
| Three players (5)
| Three players (3)
| Pepsi Center14,562
| 2–5
|- bgcolor=#cfc
| 8
| January 5
| Milwaukee
| 
| Marcus Thornton (27)
| DeMarcus Cousins (15)
| Tyreke Evans (5)
| Power Balance Pavilion11,813
| 3–5
|- bgcolor=#fcc
| 9
| January 8
| Orlando
| 
| Tyreke Evans (28)
| J. J. Hickson (11)
| Tyreke Evans (8)
| Power Balance Pavilion14,150
| 3–6
|- bgcolor=#fcc
| 10
| January 10
| @ Philadelphia
| 
| DeMarcus Cousins (17)
| DeMarcus Cousins (10)
| Francisco García (4)
| Wells Fargo Center10,255
| 3–7
|- bgcolor=#cfc
| 11
| January 11
| @ Toronto
| 
| Tyreke Evans (29)
| DeMarcus Cousins (19)
| Isaiah Thomas (6)
| Air Canada Centre14,323
| 4–7
|- bgcolor="#ffcccc"
| 12
| January 13
| @ Houston
| 
| Tyreke Evans (27)
| Donté Greene (8)
| Tyreke EvansIsaiah Thomas (5)
| Toyota Center12,870
| 4–8
|- bgcolor="#ffcccc"
| 13
| January 14
| @ Dallas
| 
| Marcus Thornton (14)
| DeMarcus Cousins (10)
| Tyreke EvansJohn Salmons (3)
| American Airlines Center20,313
| 4–9
|- bgcolor="#ffcccc"
| 14
| January 16
| @ Minnesota
| 
| Three players (12)
| Tyreke Evans (8)
| Tyreke Evans (10)
| Target Center16,159
| 4–10
|- bgcolor="#ccffcc"
| 15
| January 18
| Indiana
| 
| Marcus Thornton (17)
| DeMarcus Cousins (19)
| Tyreke Evans (6)
| Power Balance Pavilion14,170
| 5–10
|- bgcolor="#ccffcc"
| 16
| January 20
| @ San Antonio
| 
| Tyreke Evans (23)
| DeMarcus Cousins (13)
| Tyreke Evans (7)
| AT&T Center18,581
| 6–10
|- bgcolor="#ffcccc"
| 17
| January 21
| @ Memphis
| 
| Jimmer Fredette (20)
| DeMarcus Cousins (11)
| Three players (5)
| FedEx Forum16,562
| 6–11
|- bgcolor="#ffcccc"
| 18
| January 23
| @ Portland
| 
| DeMarcus Cousins (18)
| DeMarcus Cousins (13)
| Isaiah Thomas (8)
| Power Balance Pavilion20,363
| 6–12
|- bgcolor="#ffcccc"
| 19
| January 25
| Denver
| 
| Jimmer Fredette (19)
| DeMarcus Cousins (15)
| Tyreke Evans (7)
| Power Balance Pavilion12,097
| 6–13
|- bgcolor="#ffcccc"
| 20
| January 28
| @ Utah
| 
| Tyreke Evans (31)
| DeMarcus Cousins (9)
| Tyreke Evans (9)
| EnergySolutions Arena19,911
| 6–14
|- bgcolor="#ffcccc"
| 21
| January 31
| @ Golden State
| 
| Tyreke Evans (22)
| DeMarcus Cousins (14)
| Tyreke Evans (9)
| Oracle Arena17,753
| 6–15

|- bgcolor="#ccffcc"
| 22
| February 2
| Portland
| 
| Marcus Thornton (20)
| Jason Thompson (12)
| Tyreke Evans (5)
| Power Balance Pavilion11,740
| 7–15
|- bgcolor="#ccffcc"
| 23
| February 4
| Golden State
| 
| Marcus Thornton (28)
| DeMarcus Cousins (20)
| Tyreke Evans (9)
| Power Balance Pavilion16,411
| 8–15
|- bgcolor="#ccffcc"
| 24
| February 6
| @ New Orleans
| 
| DeMarcus Cousins (28)
| DeMarcus Cousins (19)
| Isaiah Thomas (6)
| New Orleans Arena13,222
| 9–15
|- bgcolor="#ffcccc"
| 25
| February 7
| @ Minnesota
| 
| Marcus Thornton (22)
| DeMarcus CousinsJ. J. Hickson (11)
| Tyreke EvansIsaiah Thomas (4)
| Target Center14,073
| 9–16
|- bgcolor="#ccffcc"
| 26
| February 9
| Oklahoma City
| 
| Tyreke Evans (22)
| Jason Thompson (10)
| Tyreke Evans (5)
| Power Balance Pavilion17,317
| 10–16
|- bgcolor="#ffcccc"
| 27
| February 11
| Phoenix
| 
| DeMarcus Cousins (26)
| DeMarcus Cousins (9)
| Tyreke Evans (5)
| Power Balance Pavilion16,964
| 10–17
|- bgcolor="#ffcccc"
| 28
| February 14
| @ Chicago
| 
| DeMarcus Cousins (28)
| DeMarcus Cousins (17)
| Tyreke Evans (8)
| United Center21,936
| 10–18
|- bgcolor="#ffcccc"
| 29
| February 15
| @ New York
| 
| Tyreke Evans (19)
| J. J. Hickson (6)
| Tyreke Evans (5)
| Madison Square Garden19,763
| 10–19
|- bgcolor="#ffcccc"
| 30
| February 17
| @ Detroit
| 
| DeMarcus Cousins (26)
| DeMarcus Cousins (15)
| Tyreke Evans (9)
| The Palace of Auburn Hills14,686
| 10–20
|- bgcolor="#ffcccc"
| 31
| February 19
| @ Cleveland
| 
| Isaiah Thomas (23)
| Marcus Thornton (10)
| Isaiah Thomas (11)
| Quicken Loans Arena16,812
| 10–21
|- bgcolor="#ffcccc"
| 32
| February 21
| @ Miami
| 
| Isaiah Thomas (24)
| Jason Thompson (10)
| Tyreke Evans (10)
| American Airlines Arena20,068
| 10–22
|- bgcolor="#ccffcc"
| 33
| February 22
| @ Washington
| 
| Tyreke EvansMarcus Thornton (22)
| DeMarcus Cousins (16)
| Isaiah Thomas (6)
| Verizon Center17,085
| 11–22
|- bgcolor="#ccffcc"
| 34
| February 28
| Utah
| 
| DeMarcus Cousins (22)
| DeMarcus Cousins (18)
| Isaiah Thomas (8)
| Power Balance Pavilion13,896
| 12–22

|- bgcolor="#ffcccc"
| 35
| March 1
| L. A. Clippers
| 
| DeMarcus Cousins (23)
| DeMarcus Cousins (10)
| Isaiah Thomas (4)
| Power Balance Pavilion15,512
| 12–23
|- bgcolor="#ffcccc"
| 36
| March 2
| @ L. A. Lakers
| 
| Francisco García (18)
| DeMarcus Cousins (13)
| Isaiah Thomas (6)
| Staples Center18,997
| 12–24
|- bgcolor="#ffcccc"
| 37
| March 4
| @ Phoenix
| 
| Marcus Thornton (21)
| DeMarcus Cousins (14)
| Tyreke Evans (6)
| US Airways Center15,026
| 12–25
|- bgcolor="#ffcccc"
| 38
| March 5
| @ Denver
| 
| Tyreke Evans, Marcus Thornton (27)
| Jason Thompson (8)
| DeMarcus Cousins, John Salmons (5)
| Pepsi Center14,823
| 12–26
|- bgcolor="#ccffcc"
| 39
| March 7
| New Orleans
| 
| Marcus Thornton (25)
| Jason Thompson (8)
| Jimmer Fredette (5)
| Power Balance Pavilion13,487
| 13–26
|- bgcolor="#ccffcc"
| 40
| March 9
| Dallas
| 
| Tyreke EvansMarcus Thornton (17)
| Tyreke Evans (9)
| DeMarcus CousinsIsaiah Thomas (5)
| Power Balance Pavilion16,857
| 14–26
|- bgcolor="#ffcccc"
| 41
| March 11
| Atlanta
| 
| DeMarcus Cousins (28)
| DeMarcus Cousins (12)
| Tyreke Evans (7)
| Power Balance Pavilion13,976
| 14–27
|- bgcolor="#ffcccc"
| 42
| March 13
| Golden State
| 
| DeMarcus Cousins (19)
| DeMarcus Cousins (12)
| Marcus Thornton (3)
| Power Balance Pavilion12,011
| 14–28
|- bgcolor="#ffcccc"
| 43
| March 14
| Detroit
| 
| Tyreke Evans (23)
| Jason Thompson (15)
| Marcus Thornton (6)
| Power Balance Pavilion12,173
| 14–29
|- bgcolor="#ccffcc"
| 44
| March 16
| Boston
| 
| Marcus Thornton (36)
| Jason Thompson (15)
| Isaiah Thomas (10)
| Power Balance Pavilion17,317
| 15–29
|- bgcolor="#ccffcc"
| 45
| March 18
| Minnesota
| 
| Marcus Thornton (24)
| Jason Thompson (10)
| Jimmer FredetteMarcus Thornton (4)
| Power Balance Pavilion15,616
| 16–29
|- bgcolor="#ccffcc"
| 46
| March 20
| Memphis
| 
| Marcus Thornton (31)
| Jason Thompson (13)
| Isaiah Thomas (7)
| Power Balance Pavilion11,105
| 17–29
|- bgcolor="#ffcccc"
| 47
| March 22
| Utah
| 
| Tyreke Evans (25)
| DeMarcus Cousins (18)
| Isaiah Thomas (7)
| Power Balance Pavilion11,646
| 17–30
|- bgcolor="#ffcccc"
| 48
| March 24
| @ Golden State
| 
| DeMarcus Cousins (28)
| DeMarcus Cousins (18)
| DeMarcus CousinsIsaiah Thomas (5)
| Oracle Arena19,596
| 17–31
|- bgcolor="#ffcccc"
| 49
| March 26
| @ Houston
| 
| DeMarcus Cousins (38)
| DeMarcus Cousins (14)
| Isaiah Thomas (6)
| Toyota Center13,572
| 17–32
|- bgcolor="#ffcccc"
| 50
| March 28
| San Antonio
| 
| Isaiah Thomas (28)
| DeMarcus Cousins (11)
| Isaiah Thomas (10)
| Power Balance Pavilion13,119
| 17–33
|- bgcolor="#ccffcc"
| 51
| March 30
| @ Utah
| 
| DeMarcus Cousins (27)
| DeMarcus Cousins (14)
| Isaiah Thomas (6)
| EnergySolutions Arena19,911
| 18–33
|- bgcolor="#ffcccc"
| 52
| March 31
| New Jersey
| 
| Tyreke Evans (23)
| Jason Thompson (10)
| Isaiah Thomas (6)
| Power Balance Pavilion14,370
| 18–34

|- bgcolor="#ccffcc"
| 53
| April 2
| Minnesota
| 
| Tyreke Evans (24)
| Terrence Williams (12)
| Tyreke Evans (7)
| Power Balance Pavilion12,279
| 19–34
|- bgcolor="#ffcccc"
| 54
| April 3
| Phoenix
| 
| DeMarcus Cousins (41)
| DeMarcus Cousins (12)
| Isaiah Thomas (7)
| Power Balance Pavilion12,462
| 19–35
|- bgcolor="#ffcccc"
| 55
| April 5
| L. A. Clippers
| 
| Isaiah Thomas (17)
| Jason Thompson (16)
| Tyreke Evans (6)
| Power Balance Pavilion14,411
| 19–36
|- bgcolor="#ffcccc"
| 56
| April 7
| @ L. A. Clippers
| 
| DeMarcus Cousins (15)
| DeMarcus Cousins (20)
| Terrence Williams (9)
| Staples Center19,060
| 19–37
|- bgcolor="#ffcccc"
| 57
| April 8
| Houston
| 
| Terrence Williams (21)
| Hassan Whiteside (10)
| Isaiah Thomas (6)
| Power Balance Pavilion13,299
| 19–38
|- bgcolor="#ffcccc"
| 58
| April 10
| @ Dallas
| 
| DeMarcus Cousins (25)
| DeMarcus Cousins (18)
| Tyreke EvansIsaiah Thomas (5)
| American Airlines Center20,241
| 19–39
|- bgcolor="#ffcccc"
| 59
| April 11
| @ New Orleans
| 
| Marcus Thornton (25)
| Jason Thompson (7)
| Tyreke Evans (8)
| New Orleans Arena16,906
| 19–40
|- bgcolor="#ffcccc"
| 60
| April 13
| @ Oklahoma City
| 
| Isaiah Thomas (21)
| DeMarcus Cousins (12)
| Terrence Williams (6)
| Chesapeake Energy Arena18,203
| 19–41
|- bgcolor="#ccffcc"
| 61
| April 15
| Portland
| 
| DeMarcus Cousins (23)
| DeMarcus CousinsChuck Hayes (7)
| Isaiah Thomas (8)
| Power Balance Pavilion16,012
| 20–41
|- bgcolor="#ffcccc"
| 62
| April 18
| San Antonio
| 
| Isaiah Thomas (21)
| DeMarcus Cousins (9)
| Isaiah ThomasTerrence Williams (8)
| Power Balance Pavilion16,954
| 20–42
|- bgcolor="#ffcccc"
| 63
| April 20
| Oklahoma City
| 
| DeMarcus Cousins (18)
| DeMarcus Cousins (9)
| Chuck Hayes (5)
| Power Balance Pavilion16,882
| 20–43
|- bgcolor="#ccffcc"
| 64
| April 22
| @ Charlotte
| 
| DeMarcus Cousins (29)
| Jason Thompson (11)
| Jason Thompson (7)
| Time Warner Cable Arena11,317
| 21–43
|- bgcolor="#ffcccc"
| 65
| April 24
| @ Oklahoma City
| 
| DeMarcus Cousins (32)
| DeMarcus CousinsTravis Outlaw (7)
| Isaiah Thomas (9)
| Chesapeake Energy Arena18,203
| 21–44
|- bgcolor="#ccffcc"
| 66
| April 26
| L. A. Lakers
| 
| DeMarcus Cousins (23)
| DeMarcus Cousins (19)
| Isaiah Thomas (7)
| Power Balance Pavilion16,281
| 22–44

Transactions

Trades

Free agents

See also
 2011–12 NBA season

References

2011-12 Sacramento Kings season
Sacramento Kings
Sacramento
Sacramento